The acronym LTAC can designate:
 Lossless Transform Audio Compression
 Literary Translators' Association of Canada
 Long-Term Archive and Compliance
 Long-Term Acute Care facility
 Louisiana Tech Athletic Club

LTAC may also refer to:
 The ICAO airport code for Esenboğa International Airport.
 The  Ltac tactic language embedded in the Coq proof assistant